This list of Elle (Portugal) cover models is a catalog of people who have appeared on the cover of the Portuguese edition of Elle magazine.

2012

2013

2014

2015

2016

2017

2018

2019

2020

2021

External links
 Elle Portugal
 Elle Portugal at Models.com

Portugal